Saint Memmius is venerated as the first bishop of Châlons-sur-Marne (now Châlons-en-Champagne), and founder of the diocese.
According to tradition, Memmius was a Roman citizen who was consecrated by Saint Peter and sent to Gaul to convert the people there to Christianity.

However, according to Flodoard, he was a contemporary of Saint Sixtus, bishop of Reims.  Memmius' sister, Saint Poma, is also venerated as a saint.

Veneration
Saint Gregory of Tours writes that while traveling through Châlons, his servant fell sick from fever.  Gregory prayed at Memmius' tomb and by the next morning Gregory's servant had been cured. Memmius' immediate successors, Donatian and Domitian, were also venerated as saints.

References

Bishops of Châlons-sur-Marne
3rd-century bishops in Gaul
300 deaths
Gallo-Roman saints
Year of birth unknown